Kumurdo Cathedral is a Georgian Orthodox Cathedral. According to the inscriptions on the walls, written with the ancient Georgian writing of Asomtavruli, the Kumurdo Cathedral was built by Ioane the Bishop during the reign of king of the Abkhazians Leon III in 964. It is the first church with emerging features of the 11-13th century architecture of Georgia. During the Middle Ages, Kumurdo was an important cultural, educational and religious center. The cathedral was restored twice (1930; 1970–1980), but it stands without a dome. In 2015, a project for full reconstruction of the cathedral was developed.

Architecture 
The domed building was constructed in stone and was decorated with fine engravings. The dome itself and the roof of the western arm are missing. In the exterior plan it has four square arms. Inside only the western arm is square. The eastern, southern and northern arms contain apses: one, two and two, respectively. Such type of multiapse design is unique among the Georgian multiapse churches. Arrow arches, powerful piers, rising up the dome, smooth bricks and fine design of the conches was aimed to give the feeling that the church stretches up.

The cathedral is richly decorated. It is possible to follow the development of ornamentation technique from the 10th to the 11th centuries. The later ornaments were placed on the walls of the western arm. The ornamentation covers windows, doors, cornice, tromps of the corners and other parts. It is composed of both geometric and floristic motifs.

The most decorated eastern facade is divided into three parts by two deep niches. The central part contains a complex decorative composition of crosses, inscription and  windows. The central window has an arch, ornamental frame and reliefs. Above it there is a rounded ornamented window, then inscription and high cross, made of red stone. Below the main window there is a small cross.

The lateral facades both contain a single nich, with reliefs above it, depicting Adam and Eve, on southern and northern facades, respectively.

The windows around the altar are decorated with replicas of bulls, eagles, lions and angels. The interior of the cathedral is decorated with mural paintings. Original paintings remain only in the apse. Of special interest is a relief portrait of Queen Gurandukht, the mother of King Bagrat III, with the cross on her breast, carved on one of the eastern squinches. She stretches her hands to the man, dressed in king's clothes, carved on another squinch.

A small chapel stands adjacent to the cathedral from the south. It was probably built at the same period, but a finely ornamented stele on its western wall dates back to the 5th or 6th centuries.

Epigraphy of the church 

The inscriptions on the southern and eastern facades tell that the church was built by architect Sakotsari with the order of Bishop Ioanne in 964.

Inscription of the Bishop Iovane (964).

Feast day inscription of the Eristavi Vache (964).

Feast day inscription of Goliat (10th-11th centuries).

Later alterations by Bishop Zosime are documented on the southern facade. He added a portal to the western arm, and ordered golden decorations from master David.
Inscription of Zosime Kumurdoeli (1027-1072).

Inscriptions on the tympanum of the western entrance to the chapel (1511-1525).

Sources 
  ვალერი სილოგავა, კუმურდოს ტაძრის ეპიგრაფიკა. თბილისი, 1994.

References 

Georgian Orthodox cathedrals in Georgia (country)
Buildings and structures in Samtskhe–Javakheti
Immovable Cultural Monuments of National Significance of Georgia